"Straight Out of Line" is a song by American rock band Godsmack and the lead single from their album Faceless. After its release in March 2003, the song immediately ascended to number one on the Mainstream Rock chart, and hit the top 10 on the Modern Rock chart. It was the band's third number one on the Mainstream Rock chart and remained at that specific position for two weeks. It is also their highest-charting single on the Billboard Hot 100, reaching No. 73.

Music video
Before the release of Faceless, Godsmack filmed a performance-based video for the song in Los Angeles with director Dean Karr. "The song has got good aggression, and the visuals, when the band plays it, look really good," Erna explained to MTV.com. "Sometimes it's really hard to shove a story within a four-minute video, unless you're a solo artist like Eminem or wherever, because all you have to do is cut back to him once in a while. When there are four guys in a band and you have to try to cover all of them and get a story in, sometimes you don't quite get the story in and it becomes irrelevant."

Grammy Awards
In 2004, the song had Grammy nomination for 'Best Hard Rock Performance'. However, the award went to Evanescence's single, "Bring Me to Life".

Appearance
"Straight Out of Line" was featured in the 2004 video game Prince of Persia: Warrior Within. It can be heard in the film A Man Apart (2003) with Vin Diesel. The song appeared on several compilations including the band's greatest hits album, Good Times, Bad Times...Ten Years of Godsmack, MTV2 Headbangers Ball, Total Rock Vol. 3, and Universal Smash Hits Vol. 2.

Chart positions

Personnel
 Sully Erna – vocals, rhythm guitar 
 Tony Rombola – lead guitar
 Robbie Merrill – bass
 Shannon Larkin – drums

See also 
 List of Billboard Mainstream Rock number-one songs of the 2000s

External links

References

Godsmack songs
2003 songs
2003 singles
Songs written by Sully Erna
Song recordings produced by David Bottrill
Universal Music Group singles